Early parliamentary elections were held in Iceland on 25 and 26 October 1959. Following the electoral reforms made after the June elections, the Independence Party won 16 of the 40 seats in the Lower House of the Althing.

Electoral reforms
The June 1959 elections had ended with both the Independence Party and the Progressive Party winning 13 seats, despite the IP receiving 42.5% of the vote to the PP's 27.2%. The electoral system involved a mix of single member constituencies, two-member constituencies elected using proportional representation (PR) and one large multi-member constituency for Reykjavík that also used PR.

The reforms saw the creation of eight multi-member constituencies elected using PR together with 11 open-list compensatory seats (parties had to win at least one constituency seat to be eligible for the compensatory seats). Five constituencies elected five members each, two elected six members each and Reykjavík elected 12. The number of seats for Reykjavík was also increased from the prior elections, increasing the overall total in the Lower House from 35 to 40 and in the Upper House from 17 to 20.

The voters’ capacity to change the order of names on the PR lists was greatly reduced compared to prior elections as well, now only being used to calculate one-third of the final number of votes deemed to have been received by each candidate, while the party’s unaltered ordering determined the remaining two-thirds.

Results

References

Iceland 2
Parliament 2
1959 10
1959 10
Icelandic parliamentary election